Caloptilia striolata is a moth of the family Gracillariidae. It is known from Fujian, China.

References

striolata
Moths of Asia
Moths described in 1990